Tournaments include international (FIBA), professional (club) and amateur and collegiate levels.

1976 Olympics 
Men:
 
 
 
Women:
 
 
 

The United States men's team won its eighth Gold medal in nine competitions. This was the first time that Women's basketball was played at the Summer Olympics.

International tournaments

Men's tournaments 

1975–76 FIBA European Champions Cup
Winner: Mobilgirgi Varèse
Runners-up: Real Madrid
1976 FIBA Intercontinental Cup

Women's tournaments 

1975–76 FIBA Women's European Champions Cup
Winner: Sparta Prague

College tournaments 
Men
1976 NCAA Men's Division II Basketball Tournament
Winner: University of Puget Sound
1976 NCAA Men's Division I Basketball Tournament
Final Four

1976 National Invitation Tournament
Winner: Kentucky
1976 NAIA Division I men's basketball tournament
Winner: Coppin State

Women
AIAW women's basketball tournament
Winner: Delta State University

ABA 
Most Valuable Player: Julius Erving, New York Nets
Rookie of the Year: David Thompson, Denver Nuggets
Coach of the Year: Larry Brown, Denver Nuggets
ABA All-Star Game MVP: Julius Erving
see also:1976 ABA All-Star Game
ABA Finals Most Valuable Player Award: Julius Erving
see also:1976 ABA Playoffs

NAIA
1976 NAIA Basketball Tournament

NBA 
NBA Draft
Most Valuable Player: Kareem Abdul-Jabbar, Los Angeles Lakers
Rookie of the Year: Alvan Adams, Phoenix Suns
Coach of the Year: Bill Fitch, Cleveland Cavaliers
NBA All-Star Game MVP:Dave Bing
see also:1976 NBA All-Star Game
NBA Champion:Boston Celtics
NBA Finals Most Valuable Player Award:Jo Jo White
see also:1976 NBA Playoffs, 1976 NBA Finals

Naismith Memorial Basketball Hall of Fame
Class of 1976:
Tom Gola
Ed Krause
Harry Litwack
Bill Sharman

Deaths
 June 8 — Bob Feerick, American NBA player and coach (born 1920)
 October 27 — Jerry Bush, American college coach (Toledo, Nebraska) (born 1914)

References

External links 
 1976 Intercontinental Cup William Jones